A Friend in California may refer to:
 A Friend in California (song)
 A Friend in California (album)